The Sydney River is a short river located in Cape Breton County, Nova Scotia, Canada. Historically, it was also referred to as the Spanish River from the 18th century French name for its estuary, Baie d’Espagnols. It separates the communities of Coxheath and Westmount, on the north bank of the river, from Howie Centre, Sydney River, and Sydney on the south and east banks.

The dam was constructed in 1902, converting the stretch of river immediately above the dam from a tidal estuary to a freshwater reservoir lake. Its watershed contains more than 2000 homes.

The Sydney River valley is glacial with thick deposits, kames, eskers and outwash gravels creating a series of shallow lakes connected by narrow channels.  This low valley was a traditional canoe portage used by the Mi'kmaq for travelling between Sydney Harbour and the East Bay of Bras d'Or Lake. The river is one of only two Canadian watersheds with a known population of the yellow lampmussel. The lampmussel is found above the dam constructed in 1902, which increased the area of freshwater habitat suitable for lampmussel in the watershed.

See also
List of rivers of Nova Scotia

References

Landforms of the Cape Breton Regional Municipality
Rivers of Nova Scotia
Landforms of Cape Breton County